Tark may refer to:

Tark, East Azerbaijan, a city in East Azerbaijan Province, Iran
Tark, Ardabil, a village in Ardabil Province, Iran
Bal Tark, a village in Gilan Province, Iran
Tark Darreh, a village in West Azerbaijan Province, Iran
Jerry Tarkanian (1930–2015), American basketball coach nicknamed "Tark"
Tark (Middle-earth), an orcish word for a Man of Gondor

See also
Tork (disambiguation)